Achille Viaene (born 21 September 1905, date of death unknown) was a Belgian racing cyclist. He rode in the 1931 Tour de France.

References

1905 births
Year of death missing
Belgian male cyclists
Place of birth missing